Weikel is an unincorporated community in Yakima County, Washington, United States, located approximately one mile north of Yakima, adjacent to Cowiche Creek, at the west end of Cowiche Canyon.

The community was founded in 1914 by the North Yakima and Valley Railway Company. Weikel was named after George Weikel whose land was acquired by the railroad for the rail right-of-way. 
 George Weikel was born came to Yakima in 1877 and helped to construct the Tieton canal. A few early maps spelled the name 'Wiekel'.

References

Northern Pacific Railway
Unincorporated communities in Yakima County, Washington
Unincorporated communities in Washington (state)